The 2019–20 Wisconsin Badgers women's basketball team represented the University of Wisconsin at Madison during the 2019–20 NCAA Division I women's basketball season. The Badgers are led by fourth-year head coach Jonathan Tsipis and play their home games at the Kohl Center as members of the Big Ten Conference.  They finished the season 12-19, including finishing 12th in the 2019–20 Big Ten Conference season with a record of 3-15, and 1-1 in the 2020 Big Ten Conference women's basketball tournament.

Previous season 
The Badgers finished the 2018-19 season 15-18, including 4-14 in Big Ten play to finish in 13th place. They lost in the third round of the Big Ten women's tournament to Michigan after beating Penn State and Ohio State.

Roster

Recruiting Class

Sources:

Schedule and results

|-
!colspan=9 style= | Exhibition

|-
!colspan=9 style=| Non-conference regular season

|-
!colspan=9 style=| Big Ten regular season

|-
!colspan=9 style=|Big Ten Conference Women's Tournament

Source

See also
 2019–20 Wisconsin Badgers men's basketball team

References

Wisconsin Badgers women's basketball seasons
Wisconsin
Wisconsin Badgers women's basketball
Wisconsin Badgers women's basketball